This was the first edition of the tournament.

Hugo Nys and Tim Pütz won the title after defeating Jeevan Nedunchezhiyan and Purav Raja 7–6(7–3), 1–6, [10–7] in the final.

Seeds

Draw

References
 Main Draw

Play In Challenger - Doubles